Gold is a double album of greatest hits by Olivia Newton-John released on 14 June 2005. It contains all but one of her solo Billboard Hot 100 hits (excluding "I Need Love") and is the first CD to contain the track "Fool Country" (a B-side to "Magic" and contained in the film Xanadu, but not available on the soundtrack). The album is considered the most thorough of all of Newton-John's many compilation albums.

A different version of the album was released in Australia in conjunction with the Olivia Gold DVD release.

Track listing

Disc one
"If Not for You" – 2:53
"Banks of the Ohio" – 3:16
"Let Me Be There" – 2:57
"If You Love Me (Let Me Know)" – 3:12
"I Honestly Love You" – 3:36
"Have You Never Been Mellow" – 3:30
"Please Mr. Please" – 3:21
"Something Better to Do" – 3:15
"Let It Shine" – 2:25
"Come On Over" – 3:40
"Don't Stop Believin'" – 3:36
"Every Face Tells a Story" – 3:40
"Sam" – 3:41
"Making a Good Thing Better" – 3:44
"Hopelessly Devoted to You" – 3:05
"Summer Nights" (with John Travolta) – 3:35
"You're the One That I Want" (with John Travolta) – 2:47
"A Little More Love" – 3:27
"Deeper Than the Night" – 3:36
"Dancin' 'Round and 'Round" – 3:59
"Totally Hot" – 3:12
"Fool Country" – 2:27

Disc two
"Xanadu" (with Electric Light Orchestra) – 3:27
"Magic" – 4:29
"Suddenly" (with Cliff Richard) – 3:58
"Physical" – 3:41
"Make a Move on Me" – 3:16
"Landslide" – 4:22
"Heart Attack" – 3:04
"Tied Up" – 4:28
"Twist of Fate" – 3:40
"Livin' in Desperate Times" – 4:03
"Soul Kiss" – 4:31
"The Best of Me" (with David Foster) – 4:04
"Can't We Talk It Over in Bed" – 3:59
"The Rumour" – 3:55
"Reach Out for Me" – 4:22
"Deeper Than a River" – 4:18
"Grease Megamix" – 4:49
"I Honestly Love You" (with Babyface) – 4:03

Australian version
"Magic"
"A Little More Love"
"Totally Hot"
"Physical"
"Twist of Fate"
"Heart Attack"
"Can't We Talk It Over in Bed"
"Deeper Than the Night"
"The Promise"
"Love Make Me Strong"
"Make a Move on Me"
"I Need Love"
"I Honestly Love You"
"Hopelessly Devoted to You" (Live)
"Sam" (Live)
"Suddenly" (Live)
"You're the One That I Want" (Live)
"Xanadu "(Live)
"Let Me Be There" (Live)
"Please Mr. Please" (Live)

Charts

References

2005 greatest hits albums
Olivia Newton-John compilation albums
Gold series albums